Mugabe and the White African is a 2009 documentary film by Lucy Bailey & Andrew Thompson and produced by David Pearson & Elizabeth Morgan Hemlock.  It has won many awards including the Grierson 2010 and been BAFTA and Emmy Nominated. The film documents the lives of a white Zimbabwean family who run a farm in Chegutu, as they challenge the Fast Track land redistribution programme that redistributed white-owned estates, a legacy of colonialism and UDI, beginning in 2000.  The film follows Mike Campbell, his son-in-law Ben Freeth, and their family as they challenge Robert Mugabe and the Zimbabwean government before the Southern African Development Community tribunal for racial discrimination and human rights violations. The film premiered in the UK on 21 October 2009 at the London Film Festival.

Reception
The documentary garnered considerable critical acclaim. It currently holds a 'fresh' rating of 97% on Rotten Tomatoes.

Awards and honours
 Sterling World Feature Award, 2009 SILVERDOCS: AFI/Discovery Channel Documentary Festival.

See also 
 Mike Campbell (Pvt) Ltd and Others v Republic of Zimbabwe

References

External links 
 
 
 Interview with Lucy Bailey
 Mugabe and the White African website on POV

2009 films
2009 documentary films
British documentary films
Films set in Zimbabwe
Films shot in Zimbabwe
Documentary films about agriculture
Documentary films about human rights
Documentary films about racism
Documentary films about African politics
Robert Mugabe
2000s English-language films
2000s British films